Wellington Centre was a federal electoral district represented in the House of Commons of Canada from 1867 to 1904. It was located in the province of Ontario.

It was created by the British North America Act of 1867, which divided the County of Wellington, divided into North, South and Centre Ridings. The Centre Riding consisted of the Townships of Anson, Garrafraxa, Erin, Eramosa, Nichol, and Pilkington, and the Villages of Fergus and Elora.

In 1872, it was defined to consist of the Townships of Pilkington, Elora, Nichol, Fergus, Garrafraxa West, Garrafraxa East, Peel and the Village of Orangeville. In 1882, the township Maryboro' was added to the riding.

The electoral district was abolished in 1903 when it was redistributed between Dufferin, Wellington North and Wellington South ridings.

Electoral history

|- 
  
|Liberal
|PARKER, Thomas Sutherland
|align="right"|acclaimed   
|}

|- 
  
|Liberal
|ROSS, James  
|align="right"| acclaimed   
|}

|- 
  
|Liberal
|ROSS, James   
|align="right"| 1,434

|Liberal-Conservative
|ORTON, George Turner   
|align="right"| 1,388    
|}

|- 

|Liberal-Conservative
|ORTON, George Turner 
|align="right"| 1,530 
 
|Unknown
|MCKINE, R.  
|align="right"| 1,481    
|}

|- 

|Liberal-Conservative
|ORTON, George Turner   
|align="right"| 1,571 
  
|Liberal
|ROSS, James 
|align="right"|1,445    
|}

|- 

|Liberal-Conservative
|ORTON, George Turner 
|align="right"|1,683 
 
|Unknown
|ROBINSON, J. 
|align="right"|1,677   
|}

|- 

|Liberal-Conservative
|ORTON, George Turner 
|align="right"| 2,208
  
|Liberal
|CARTWRIGHT, Sir R.J. 
|align="right"| 2,056    
|}

|- 
  
|Liberal
|SEMPLE, Andrew
|align="right"| 2,427 

|Liberal-Conservative
|ORTON, George Turner 
|align="right"| 2,377    
|}

|- 
  
|Liberal
|SEMPLE, Andrew 
|align="right"|2,455   

|Conservative
|HUNTER, Wm. H.
|align="right"| 2,299   
|}

|- 
  
|Liberal
|SEMPLE, Andrew 
|align="right"| 1,917 

|Conservative
|LEWIS, F.W.
|align="right"|1,295 
 
|Independent
| GROVES, Abraham 
|align="right"|752 
 
|Independent
| GORDON, W.L. 
|align="right"|599 
|}

|- 

|Liberal-Conservative
|MCGOWAN, John 
|align="right"|2,364 
  
|Liberal
|SEMPLE, Andrew
|align="right"| 2,079    
|}

See also 

 List of Canadian federal electoral districts
 Past Canadian electoral districts

External links 

 Website of the Parliament of Canada

Former federal electoral districts of Ontario